The Ministry of Finance and Economic Planning (MINECOFIN) is a government ministry of the Republic of Rwanda; the current Minister of Finance and Economic Planning is Dr. Ndagijimana Uzziel. The Ministry is located in the Nyarugenge district of Kigali, close to the city centre.

Operations
The responsibilities of the Ministry include preparing and presenting the national budget; managing the Treasury and the National Bank of Rwanda; and national economic planning.

The institutional purview of the Ministry includes the School of Finance and Banking in Kigali and the Rwanda Revenue Authority.

The Ministry's Public Relations Office publishes an informational newsmagazine, the Minecofin Magazine.

Ministers of Finance
Gaspard Cyimana, October 1960 – June 1968
Fidèle Nzanana, June 1968 – February 1972
Bonaventure Ntibitura, July 1973 – August 1973
Jean-Chrysostome Nduhungirehe, August 1973 – June 1975
Denys Ntirugirimbabazi, June 1975 – March 1981
Jean-Damascene Hategikimana, March 1981 – April 1987
Vincent Ruhamanya, April 1987 - January 1989
Bénoit Ntigurirwa, January 1989 – December 1991
Enoch Ruhigira, December 1991 – April 1992
Marc Rugenera, April 1992 – April 1994
Emmanuel Ndindabahizi, April 1994 – July 1994
Marc Rugenera, 1994 – 1997
Jean-Berchmans Birara, 1997
Donald Kaberuka, 1997 – 2005
Manasseh Nshuti, 2005 – 2006
James Musoni, 2006 – 2009
John Rwagombwa, 2009 – 2013
Claver Gatete, 2013 – 2018
Uzziel Ndagijimana, 2018 –

References

External links

 Ministry of Finance and Economic Planning
School of Finance and Banking
Minecofin Magazine

Economy of Rwanda
Finance and Economic Planning
Rwanda
Kigali
Rwanda